The Dutch Eredivisie in the 1986–87 season was contested by 18 teams. PSV Eindhoven won the championship. At the beginning of the season, AZ '67 from Alkmaar changed their name to AZ.

League standings

Results

Play-offs
This year, play-offs were held for one UEFA-Cup-ticket.

See also
 1986–87 Eerste Divisie
 1986–87 KNVB Cup

References

 Eredivisie official website - info on all seasons 

Eredivisie seasons
Netherlands
1986–87 in Dutch football